"Secret Messages" is a song recorded by Electric Light Orchestra (ELO) and is the title track (and opening track) of the 1983 album Secret Messages.

The song begins with strange effects and a backmasked voice (saying "welcome to the show") followed by a burst of morse code spelling out E.L.O., something Jeff Lynne did also 10 years earlier on "Ocean Breakup/King of the Universe" from On the Third Day. The song and album were recorded very much tongue in cheek with Jeff Lynne's love of hidden messages in songs.

The single peaked at 48 in the UK Singles Chart and at number 14 in the Irish Singles Chart.

Parts of the music video featuring a radio telescope were filmed at Jodrell Bank in Cheshire, England.

Chart history

References 

1983 songs
1983 singles
Electric Light Orchestra songs
Song recordings produced by Jeff Lynne
Songs written by Jeff Lynne
Jet Records singles